Cereins are a group of bacteriocins produced by various strains of the bacterium Bacillus cereus. Although all cereins are by definition produced by B. cereus, it is possible that they are chemically quite different from one another. Cereins have been found to be active against other strains of B. cereus, as well as a broad range of other gram-positive bacteria. Like other bacteriocins, cereins are generally named after the strain in which their production was first discovered. Named cereins include cerein 7, cerein 7B, cerein 8A, and cerein MRX1.

Clinical Research 
It has been studies that a type of group of Cerein 8A is very effective in inhibiting the effects of the a pathogenic bacteria called Salmonella Enteritidis. The Pathogen causes Diarrhea, Stomach aches, and Fever. In a clinical research it was discovered that the higher the amount of Cerein 8A in combination with combination with sodium lactate the more likely we have destruction of the Salmonella Enteritidis. The Cerein 8A is also researched to inhibit Listeria Monocytones a pathogenic bacteria commonly found in dairy products such as milk. The bacteria causes diarrhea and stomach aches and is very fatal to pregnant women. The research was conducted to visualize the efficiency of Listeria Monocytogenes in milk and soft cheese. It was discovered that the addiction of the Cerein 8A bacteria caused the pathogenic bacteria to decrease in its normal cell growth. The Cerein bacteriocins are studied continually in research to propose more preventative possibilities.

References

Bacteriocins